Platynota illuminata is a species of moth of the family Tortricidae. It is found in French Guiana.

References

Moths described in 1917
Platynota (moth)